Napoleon abdicated on 22 June 1815 in favour of his son Napoleon II. On 24 June the Provisional Government proclaimed the fact to the French nation and the world.

After his defeat at the Battle of Waterloo, instead of remaining in the field with his shattered army, Napoleon returned to Paris in the hope of retaining political support for his position as Emperor of the French. He hoped, with his political base secured, to then be able to continue the war. It was not to be; instead the members of the two chambers created a Provisional Government and demanded that Napoleon abdicate. Napoleon toyed with the idea of a coup d'état similar to Eighteenth of Brumaire but decided against it. On 25 June Napoleon left Paris for the final time and after staying at the Palace of Malmaison, left for the coast hoping to reach the United States of America. In the meantime, the Provisional Government deposed his son and tried to negotiate a conditional surrender with the Coalition powers. They failed to obtain any significant concessions from the Coalition who insisted on a military surrender and the restoration of Louis XVIII. Napoleon, realising he could not hope to evade the Royal Navy, surrendered to Captain Maitland upon placing himself under his protection on board HMS Bellerophon. The British Government refused to allow Napoleon to set foot in England and arranged for his exile to the remote South Atlantic island of Saint Helena where he died in 1821.

Return to Paris,  21 June

With the defeat at Waterloo, the enthrallment of the French people that had gripped them since Napoleon's return from exile rapidly dissipated, and they were forced to face the reality of several Coalition armies advancing into France up to the gates of Paris.

His commanders in the field pressed him to remain and continue to command in the field, but Napoleon calculated that if he did so then the home front might capitulate to the Coalition and undermine any successes he had in the field. Napoleon had said after his defeat in Russia that his presence in Paris confounded the sceptics. For the sword by which the Empire had been raised and held in subjection, by which Europe itself had been mesmerised and all but conquered, had fallen powerless from his grasp. In him were no longer centred the might and the will of imperial France. These had been delegated through the constitution, to the organs of the nation, the elected representatives of the people. He no longer possessed, in his own person, the administrative and the executive; but was under the control of that power which, as before observed, when he left Paris to join the army, he dreaded more than the enemy he was going to confront — the power of French public opinion legitimately expressed.  If he had so keenly felt its force before his downfall on the battlefield; how great, nay, how hopeless, must have appeared to him the task of endeavouring to soothe its excitement, and to obtain its sanction to renewed sacrifices,  when suddenly appearing in Paris on the afternoon of 21 June — but one short week from the time of his assuming the command of his Army — himself to announce the disastrous result of his enterprise.

The imperialists in the capital, who had indulged in the most extravagant hopes engendered by the news of the victory at Ligny, had scarcely manifested their exultation when sinister rumours began to spread of some sudden reverses which had befallen the cause of Napoleon; and presently all doubts and suspense were removed by the unexpected appearance of the Emperor Napoleon himself, which gave  rise to the most gloomy anticipations. Napoleon arrived in Paris only two hours after the news of the defeat at Waterloo had arrived. His arrival temporarily caused those who were conspiring against him to cease their machinations.

Napoleon's calculated return to Paris may have been a political mistake, because it was seen by some as a desertion of his men and even an act of cowardice. If he had remained in the field the nation might have rallied and perhaps fortune might have favoured him. Had the Chambers received the news of his defeat at Waterloo and moved to depose him, then their decrees might not have been followed by a nation still in arms.

Mary, an English woman living in France who arrived in Paris shortly after the defeat, made the point that the French were now becoming used to regime changes (they had had two instances in 15 months) and that these seemed to affect most of the populace no more than a change of government in contemporary early 19th century Britain — not only had most of the civil servants kept their jobs, even some ministers had survived the regime changes — so many were disinclined to risk their lives or property for any regime. This was very different from the perceptions of the general populace that had accompanied the first revolution and, after the terror, Napoleon's subsequent usurpation.

Cabinet deliberations
Napoleon immediately summoned a Cabinet Council. He frankly explained to his ministers the critical state of affairs; but, at the same time, with his usual confidence in his own resources, declared his conviction, that if the nation were called upon to rise en masse, the annihilation of the enemy would follow; but that if, instead of ordering new levies and adopting extraordinary measures, the Chambers were to allow themselves to be drawn into debates, and to waste their time in disputation, all would be lost. "Now that the enemy is in France", he added, "it is necessary that I should be invested with extraordinary power, that of a temporary dictatorship. As a measure of safety for the country, I might assume this power; but it would be better and more national that it should be conferred upon me by the Chambers".
 
The ministers were too well acquainted with the general views and disposition of the Chamber of Representatives to pronounce a direct approval of this step; but Napoleon, perceiving their hesitation, called upon them to express their opinion upon the measures of public safety required by existing circumstances. Lazare, Count of Carnot, the Minister of the Interior, conceived it to lie essential that the country should be declared in danger; that the Fédérés and National Guards should be called to arms; that Paris should be placed in a stage of siege, and measures adopted for its defence; that at the last extremity the armed force should retire behind the Loire, and take up an entrenched position; that the Army of La Vendee, where the Civil War had nearly terminated, as also the Corps of Observation in the south, should be recalled: and the enemy checked until sufficient force could be united and organised for the assumption of a vigorous offensive, by which he should be driven out of France. Decrès, the Minister of the Navy, and Regnaud de Saint Jean d'Angely, the Secretary of State, supported this opinion; but Fouché, the Minister of Police, and the remaining ministers, remarked that the safety of the state did not depend upon any particular measure which might thus be proposed, but upon the Chambers of the Estates (Parliament); and upon their uniting with the head of the government: and that by manifesting towards them confidence and good faith, they would be induced to declare it to be their duty to unite with Napoleon in the adoption of energetic measures for securing  the honour and independence of the nation.

Fouché's policy
This advice on the part of Fouché was an artful piece of dissimulation. No man in France possessed so intimate a knowledge of the secret workings of the public mind; he knew precisely the dispositions and views of the different factions, as also the character and temperament of their leaders. This knowledge, obtained with an adroitness and a precision quite peculiar to this celebrated Minister of Police, he made completely subservient to his own personal views. These had been, from the commencement of Napoleon's second reign, to coquet with the factions in such a manner as to induce each to consider him an indispensable instrument in the realisation of its hopes, and to exert this extraordinary influence either to support or to undermine the power of Napoleon, according as the fortunes of the latter might be in the ascendant or on the decline. The resolute attitude assumed by the allies soon satisfied him that, although the Emperor might once more dazzle the world with some brilliant feat of arms, he must eventually succumb to the fixed determination of the other sovereign powers to crush his usurped authority; and to the overwhelming masses with which Europe was preparing to subjugate the country. He had been, and was still, in secret communication with the ministers and advisers of Louis XVIII; and was consequently in full possession of the general plans and intentions of the coalition powers.

When, therefore, Napoleon's enterprise had so signally failed, and the re-occupation of Paris appeared to be its necessary consequence: Fouché foresaw clearly, that were the proposed dictatorship to be assumed by means of a sudden and forced dissolution of the Chambers, implying that the recent reverses had been produced by treachery on the part of the Representatives; and were new levies to be raised en masse, in support of the force that yet remained available; the result would inevitably be anarchy and confusion in the capital, disorder and excesses throughout the whole country, renewed disasters to the nation, together with an awful and useless sacrifice of life. To prevent such a catastrophe (as Fouché thought it would be), it was necessary to lull Napoleon's suspicions of the intentions of the Chambers; with which, at the same time, Fouché was fully acquainted. Hence it was, that to gain sufficient time for the development of these intentions, Fouché gave to the Council the advice before mentioned.

Fouché strongly expressed his disapproval of the projected Dissolution of the Chambers, and assumption of the Dictatorship; declaring that any measures of that kind would only turn to distrust, and, not improbably, a general revolt. But, at the same time, his agents were making known throughout Paris the fullest extent of the disasters that had befallen Napoleon, and which had caused his sudden and unexpected return; and the Representatives were assembling in all haste, and in great numbers, to take a bold and decided  step in the great national crisis.

In thus concealing from his Master the real disposition of the great political Parties, and the true state of the public mind, Fouché, no doubt, betrayed the trust reposed in him; but, setting aside the question whether he was really influenced by patriotic motives, or merely acting upon a system of deep duplicity and time serving expediency, there can also be no doubt that, by pursuing the line of conduct which he did on this important occasion, he became the means of preserving his country from the infliction of a still further accumulation of evils.

The Cabinet Council continued in discussion; some supporting, and others disapproving, the propositions of Napoleon: who, at length, yielding to the arguments of  Fouché and Carnot, declared he would submit himself to the loyalty of the Chambers, and confer with them as to the measures which the critical position of the country might render necessary.

Resolutions of the Chamber of Representatives
In the meantime, the Representatives had met, early on 21 June 1815, and commenced their deliberations on the existing state of affairs. Marquis de Lafayette, the acknowledged Leader of the Liberal Party, having received intelligence of the subject of discussion in the Council, and aware that not a moment was to be lost in averting the blow with which their liberties were menaced, ascended the tribune, and addressed the Chamber, amidst the most profound silence, and breathless suspense:

No one ventured to oppose these bold resolutions—The Imperialist Party was taken by surprise. The leading members were now elsewhere with Napoleon Bonaparte, and the others had not the courage to face the impending storm—and, after a brief discussion, in which their instant adoption was urged in the strongest manner, they were carried by acclamation, with the exception of the Fourth, which was suspended on account of the invidious distinction which it appeared to convey between the troops of the Line and the National Guards.

They were then transmitted to the Chamber of Peers; where, after a short discussion, they were adopted without amendment.

Further Cabinet discussions
The Message from the Chambers, conveying these resolutions, reached the Council in the midst of its deliberations. Napoleon was staggered by an act which he looked upon as an usurpation of the Sovereign Authority. To him, who had so long exercised an almost unlimited control in the State, who had led mighty Armies to victory, and who had subjected powerful nations to his despotic sway, this sudden and energetic voice of the people, conveyed through the medium of their Representatives, aroused him to a full sense of the wonderful change which had been effected in the public mind, and in his own individual position, through the intervention of a Constitution. He was alike indignant at what he conceived to be a daring presumption, and mortified at his own miscalculation in having convoked the Chambers. J'avais bien, pensé, he remarked, que jaurais du congédier ces gens-Ià avant mon départ.

Napoleon's message to the Representatives
After some reflection, Napoleon  determined, if possible, to temporize with the Chambers. He sent Regnaud de Saint Jean d'Angely to the Chamber of Representatives, in his capacity of Member, to soothe the irritation that prevailed, to relate that the army had been upon the point of gaining a great victory, when disaffected individuals created a panic; that the troops had since rallied; and that the Emperor had hastened to Paris to concert, with the Ministers and the Chambers, such measures for the public safety as circumstances seemed to require. Carnot was directed to make a similar communication to the Chamber of Peers.

Regnaud vainly endeavoured to fulfill his mission. However, the Representatives had lost all patience, and insisted upon the Ministers presenting themselves at the bar of the House. The latter at length obeyed the summons; Napoleon having consented, though with great reluctance, to their compliance with the mandate. He required them, however, to be accompanied by his brother Lucien Bonaparte, as an Extraordinary Commissioner, appointed to reply to the Interrogatories of the Chamber.

At 18:00 in the evening of 21 June, Lucien Bonaparte and the Ministers made their appearance in the Chamber of Representatives. Lucien announced that he had been sent there by Napoleon as a Commissioner Extraordinary, to concert with the Assembly measures of safety. He then placed in the hands of the President the Message of which he was the bearer from his brother. It contained a succinct recital of the disasters experienced at Mont St Jean: and recommended the Representatives to unite with the Head of the State in preserving the country from the fate of Poland, and from the re-imposition of the yoke which it had thrown off. It stated, also, that it was desirable that the two Chambers should appoint a Commission of five Members, to concert with the Ministers the measures to be adopted for the public safety, and the means of treating for peace with the Coalition Powers.

This Message was far from being favourably received. A stormy discussion ensued, in the course of which it was soon made manifest that the Representatives required a more explicit declaration of Napoleon's opinions and designs: one, in fact, more in accordance with the views which the majority of them evidently entertained, and was apparently determined to enforce. One of their number significantly remarked, as he addressed himself to the Ministers,

Several of the members spoke in a similar strain, and the debate was kept up with great animation, until at length it was agreed, that in conformity with the terms of the Imperial Message, a Commission of five Members should be appointed.

Commission of ten members
On 21 June the Commission of five Members consisting of the President and Vice Presidents of the Chamber of Representatives, to collect, in concert with the Cabinet and with a Committee from the Chamber of Peers, the fullest information upon the state of France, and to propose suitable measures of safety, was created. The Committee consisted of Messrs Lanjuinais (President of the Chamber of Peers), La Fayette, Dupont de l'Eure, Flaugergues, and Grenier.

At 20:30 Lucien Bonaparte, now presented himself, in the same capacity of Commissioner Extraordinary, to the Chamber of Peers. After hearing the message, the latter also appointed a Committee, which consisted of Generals Drouot, Dejean, Andreossy and Messrs Boissy d'Anglas and Thibaudeau.

At 23:00 that evening La Fayette addressed the 10 members of the joint commission and put forward two motions, the first calling for the abdication of Napoleon and the second for a special commission to negotiate terms with the allied coalition. Both motions were carried and they agreed to allow Napoleon one hour in which to respond to their ultimatum.

Napoleon, being fully informed of the proceedings of the Chamber of Representatives, and of the general tenor of the debates, hesitated a long time whether to dissolve the Assembly or to abdicate the Imperial Crown. Some of his Ministers, on perceiving the direction of his views, assured him that the Chamber had acquired too firm a hold of the public opinion to submit to any violent coup d'état and expressed their opinion, that by withholding the act of abdication, he might eventually deprive himself of the power of vacating the throne in favour of his son. Nevertheless, he appeared determined to defer this step to the very last moment; trusting in the meantime some favourable event might occur, tending to modify the present disposition of the Chamber.

Morning of 22 of June
The Representatives met again at 09:30 the following morning (22 June). The utmost impatience was manifested for the report of the Committee. Two hours having elapsed, the Members became greatly excited. Some of them proposed that the exigencies of the state were such, that it was their duty to adopt immediate and decisive measures, without  waiting for the report.

At length, in the midst of the agitation and tumult which prevailed, General Grenier, the reporter of the Committee, suddenly made his appearance. He stated that, after a deliberation of five hours, the Committee had resolved:

This statement excited general murmurs of disapprobation. But General Grenier, aware of the expectations of the Chamber, continued:

This produced an extraordinary sensation in the Chamber.  It was looked upon as an artful design upon the part of Napoleon to create delay by proposing to the Chambers a proceeding which he was well aware would prove unsuccessful; and to seize the first favourable opportunity of destroying their independence, and re-establishing his despotism — to re-enact, in short, the Eighteenth of Brumaire. The tumult had reached a fearful height. Many members exclaimed vehemently against the report.

At length, one of them, the Representative for Isère, ascended the tribune, and spoke in the following energetic and decided manner:

Duchesne was interrupted by the President, who announced that the message from the Emperor to which the reporter had referred would be received before 3:00 that afternoon. The interruption, however, at this most important point of the debate, renewed the tumult in the Chamber. Some exclaimed, "It is a concerted plan to make us lose time". Others cried out, "Some plot is concerting"; and the majority vociferated, "Proceed, proceed; there is no middle course".

Duchesne continued:

No sooner was this word pronounced than the entire Assembly rose; and amidst the clamour that ensued were heard a hundred voices exclaiming, "Seconded! seconded!".

When, at length, the President succeeded in restoring some degree of order, he said:

The proposition of Duchesne was instantly supported by General Solignac: an officer who, during the last five years, had been made to suffer the severest mortifications, arising from the hatred entertained towards him by Napoleon, in consequence of his refusal to be the servile instrument of his ambition; and, therefore, the curiosity of the Chamber was naturally excited to hear what course he was about to adopt. General Solignac said:

This proposition was most favourably received, and the President was on the point of putting it to the vote, when Solagnac again appeared in the tribune:

This speech was met with cries of "Yes! Yes! To the vote!" (the general exclamation). Marshal Davout, Prince of Eckmühl then came to the Chamber and read an extract from a dispatch from Marshal Soult, Duke of Dalmatia, and concluded that the situation was grave but no hopeless adding

A member asked if this was true in the light of reports that Coalition forces had penetrated as far as Laon? Davout denied the fact and repeated that in his expert view that the military situation not hopeless. Shortly after the conclusion of his address, at 11:00 the Chamber adjourned.

Abdication, afternoon 22 June
In the meantime, Napoleon had been made acquainted with the disposition of the Chamber of Representatives, by Regnaud de Saint Jean d'Angely, who hastened to warn him that if he did not immediately abdicate, his deposition would, in all probability, be declared.

Napoleon was enraged at the idea of this contemplated violence, and stated

Regnaud, however, urged him in the strongest manner to yield to imperious circumstances, and to renew the noble and generous sacrifice he made in 1814. He assured him that if he did not take this step, he would be accused by the Chamber, and even by the whole Nation, of having, out of personal considerations alone, prevented the possibility of obtaining peace.

Solignac and other Representatives were then announced. They boldly declared to him that he had no other course open to him but that of submission to the desire entertained by the Representatives of the Nation. Solignac described to him the scene in the Chamber of Representatives, and the difficulty he had experienced in inducing the latter to suspend, even for one hour, their decision; which, if not anticipated by a voluntary Abdication, would entail upon him the disgrace of forfeiture. Even his brothers, Lucie and Joseph, now gave their opinion that the moment for resistance had passed.

When the paroxysm of rage, to which these representations gave rise, had subsided, Napoleon announced his determination to abdicate in favour of his son; and, desiring his brother Lucien to take a pen, he dictated to him a declaration of abdication in favour of his son under the title Napoleon II, Emperor of the French.

The sitting of the house of Chambers had resumed at midday and at 13:00 Joseph Fouché, Caulaincourt, Davout, and Carnot carried the declaration to the house and the President read it out. It was heard in respectful silence by all, and with considerable relief by those opposition members who had feared a last minute coup d'état.

The resignation was the last great act of Napoleon's political life. Defeated and humbled by foreign enemies in the field, subdued and controlled by the Representatives of the Nation; he was forced to descend from a throne whence he had at one time swayed the destinies of sovereigns rendered dependent on his mighty will. Almost all the previous changes and gradations in his extraordinary career had been preluded or accompanied by some magnificent scene of dramatic effect, or a violent Coup d'état but, in this instance, the transition was attended by no circumstance more remarkable than the quietude with which it was effect. The cessation of the political existence of such a man would have been most naturally looked for as an event coincident only with the termination of a life which, if not closed upon the pinnacle of glory, would be sought for amidst the shock of battle, or in the vortex of a state convulsion.

That he meditated a second Eighteenth of Brumaire, there can be no doubt; but the decided tone of the debates in the National Assembly, the solicitations of his friends, and the hope of securing the throne to his family, induced him to abandon all idea of such a project. It is, besides, more than probable that, aware as he was of the bad feeling that existed, to a great extent, both in the Chambers and in the country, towards King Louis XVIII; as also of the conflicting principles of the different factions, he calculated upon the chances of an Involution productive of anarchy and confusion, which he yet might be called upon to reduce to order and submission.

When it is considered that the great mass of the Army of the Line was devoted to Napoleon; that the rallied Army of the North was falling back upon Paris, where it would concentrate its strength and be reinforced from Regimental Depots; and, further, that the armies on the Eastern Frontier were still holding their respective positions, and that even in La Vendée the Imperial troops had succeeded in quelling the insurrection, — when, in addition to all this, it is considered how great, how extraordinary, was the influence induced by the prestige of Napoleon with the majority of the nation, dazzled as the latter had been by countless victories that outweighed, in its estimation, those fatal disasters which it ascribed solely to the united power of the great European Coalition established against France, — the contemporary British historian William Siborne considered it is impossible not to be struck by the firm, bold, and determined attitude assumed by the French Parliament, on this critical occasion, that it displayed one of the brightest examples the world had yet beheld of the force of constitutional legislation; and under all the attendant circumstances, it was a remarkable triumph of free institutions over monarchical despotism.

Selection of the commissioners of government
Once the formalities of the Napoleon's abdication had been observed, the house debated what should be done next. Some supported a regency government under Napoleon II, others a republic, and while most were against the restoration of Louis XVIII they realised that they were going to have to reach an accommodation with the Coalition powers, but did to want to spark a Coup d'état from the Army which still sympathetic to Napoleon. The Chamber rejected a proposition to declare themselves a national or constituent assembly on the grounds that such a measure would be an usurpation of authority and destroy the constitution under which they were acting. So the Chamber decided to elect a commission of government to authorise a new government under the constitution and decided not to communicate with the Coalition armies but to allow the new executive arm of the government to do so.

There were five hundred and eleven members present at the first round of voting for the commissioners of government:
Lazare, Count Carnot received 304 votes
Joseph Fouché, Duke of Otranto received 293 votes
General Paul Grenier received 204 votes
General Gilbert du Motier, Marquis de Lafayette received 142 votes
Marshal Jacques MacDonald received 137 votes
Pierre Flaugergues received 46 votes
Charles Lambrechts  received 42 votes

Consequently, Carnot and Fouché were proclaimed two of the three members of the commission. During the second round of voting, a motion was made to make the sitting permanent. Grenier was chosen third member of the commission with 350 votes; and then the sitting was adjourned until 11:00 the next morning.

The house of peers met about 13:30 and Carnot read out the abdication proclamation.  This was listen to quietly, but when the count then reported on the state of the army a heated debate took place with Marshal Nay stating that:

The peers were informed what the Chamber of Representatives had decided. Prince Lucien and other Bonepartists who pointed out that Napoleon had abdicated in favour of his son and if his son was not recognised then the abdication could be considered void. The chamber decided not to support the Bonepartists and agreed to send two of their members to sit as commissioners of government. In the first round of voting Armand Caulaincourt, Duke of Vicenza was elected with 51 votes, and in the second round Nicolas Quinette, Baron Quinnette gained 48 votes and was named the fifth member of the commission. The peers finally adjourned at 2:30am on 23 June.

Formation of a Provisional Government, 23 June
On the morning of 23 June the commissioners appointed Joseph Fouché, Duke of Otranto as its president. Marshal André Masséna, Prince of Essling was named commander in chief of the Parisian National Guard, Count Andreossy commander of the first military division, and Count Drouot of the Imperial Guard. Baron Bignon was chosen minister, provisionally, for foreign affairs, General Carnot of the interior, and Count Pelet de la Lozère of the police.

That evening plenipotentiaries were set out to treat in the name of the nation, and to negotiate with the European powers for that peace which they have promised them, on a condition which has now been fulfilled (that Napoleon Bonaparte was no longer recognised by the French Government to be Emperor of the French — however as Representative Bigonnet had pointed out in a heated debate in the Chamber, the coalition were in arms to secure the Treaty of Paris of 1814 under which Napoleon and his family were excluded from the throne.) The commissioners sent to treat with the allies were Messrs. Lafayette, Sebastiani, D’Argenson, Count Laforêt, and Count Pontecoulant, attended by Benjamin Constant as secretary; they left Paris in the evening of 24 June.

Paris Proclamation of the Provisional Government, 24 June
On 24 June, the Provisional Government in Paris, which had been appointed on the previous day after a stormy discussion in both Chambers on the subject of the recognition of Napoleon II, and which consisted five men, two of whom were appointed by the Chamber of Peers and three by the Chamber of Representatives: Joseph Fouché, Duke of Otranto, the Minister of the Police; Armand Caulaincourt, Duke of Vicenza, the Minister of Foreign Affairs; Lazare Carnot, Minister of the Interior; General Paul Grenier; and Nicolas Quinette; issued the a proclamation that Napoleon was abdicating for the "peace [of France] and that of the World" in favour of his son Napoleon II.

Napoleon leaves Paris for the Palace of Malmaison, 25 June

On 25 June, Napoleon withdrew from the capital to the country Palace of Malmaison ( east of the centre of Paris). From there he issued an address to the army in which he encouraged the soldiers to fight on.

Napoleon II deposed, 26 June
On 26 June the government transmitted to the chambers a bulletin tending to confirm the favourable accounts from the army, and to assure them, that their affairs were a more favourable aspect than at first could have been hoped; that they would neither exaggerate nor dissimulate the dangers, and in all emergencies would stand true to their country. On the same day the government issued a public proclamation that explained how the law was to operate "In the name of the French people" instead of in the name of Napoleon II, and thus, after a reign of three days, Napoleon II has been replaced by the French people.

Napoleon leaves Malmaison for America, 29 June
To facilitate his departure from the country, the Provisional Government requested that a passport and assurances of safety might be accorded to Napoleon and his family, to enable them to pass to the United States of America. Blücher ignored the request, and Wellington referred the Commissioners to his note of 26 June on the proposed Suspension of Hostilities; and stated that, with regard to the passport for Napoleon, he had no authority from his Government, or from the Allies, to give any answer to such demand.

The commissioners appointed by the government to communicate its wishes to Napoleon, no longer hesitated in arranging his departure. The minister of the marine, and Count Boulay, repaired to his residence, and explained to him that Wellington and Blücher had refused to give him any safeguard or passport, and that he had now only to take his immediate departure.

Napoleon narrowly escaped falling into the hands of the Prussians, whilst at Malmaison. Blücher, hearing that he was living there in retirement, had despatched Major von Colomb, on 28 June, with the 8th Hussars and two battalions of infantry to secure the bridge at Chatou, lower down the Seine, leading directly to the house. Fortunately, for Napoleon, Marshal Davout, when he ascertained that the Prussians were nearing the capital, had ordered General Becker to destroy the bridge. Hence, Major von Colomb was very disappointed to find there was no passage at this point, which in fact was not more than  distant from the palace, in which Napoleon was yet remaining at the time of the arrival of the Prussians.

Napoleon at length yielded to what he considered to be his destiny, and the preparations for travelling having been completed, he entered his carriage at about 17:00 on 29 June, accompanied by Generals Bertrand, Gourgaud, and other devoted friends, and took the road to Rochefort, whither two French frigates had been ordered for the embarkation of himself and his entourage for America.

Capture by the British, 10 July

As agreed in the Convention of St. Cloud, on 3 July, the French Army, commanded by Marshal Davoust, quit Paris and proceeded on its march to the Loire. On 7 July, the two Coalition armies entered Paris. The Chamber of Peers, having received from the Provisional Government a notification of the course of events, terminated its sittings; the Chamber of Representatives protested, but in vain. Their President (Lanjuinais) resigned his Chair; and on the following day, the doors were closed, and the approaches guarded by foreign troops.

On 8 July, the French King, Louis XVIII, made his public entry into his capital, amidst the acclamations of the people, and again occupied the throne. Also that day, Napoleon Bonaparte embarked, at Rochefort, on board the French frigate Saale, and proceeded, accompanied by Méduse, in which was his small entourage, to an anchorage in the Basque Roads off the Isle of Aix, with the intention of setting sail to America.

On 10 July, the wind became favourable, but a British fleet made its appearance; and Napoleon, seeing the difficulty of eluding the vigilance of its cruisers, resolved, after having previously communicated with Captain Maitland, upon placing himself under his protection on board HMS Bellerophon, which vessel he accordingly reached on 15 July. On the following day, Captain Maitland sailed for England; and arrived at Torbay, with his illustrious charge, on 24 July. Despite his protestations, Napoleon was not permitted to land in England (the British Government having decided upon sending him to the island of Saint Helena). On 26 July, Bellerophon received orders to sail for Plymouth, and there he remained for several days. On 4 August, he was moved to HMS Northumberland, a third-rate ship of the line, under Rear Admiral Sir George Cockburn, in which ship he sailed to his incarceration on the remote South Atlantic island. Napoleon remained a captive on Saint Helena until his death in 1821.

Notes

References
 
 
 
  
 
 
 
 
 

Attribution:

Further reading

Napoleon
1815 in France
Hundred Days
June 1815 events
Abdication